The year 1940 in television involved some significant events.
Below is a list of television-related events during 1940.



Events
January – The FCC has public hearings concerning television.
February 25 – The first ice hockey game is televised in the United States, the New York Rangers vs Montreal Canadiens, from Madison Square Garden on W2XBS-TV.
February 28 – The first basketball game is televised, from Madison Square Garden: Fordham University vs the University of Pittsburgh.
March 10 – The Metropolitan Opera broadcast for the first time from NBC studios at Rockefeller Center an abridged performance of the first act of Pagliacci, along with excerpts from four other operas.
March 15 – RCA reduces the price of television sets.
May 21 – Bell Telephone Laboratories transmits a 441-line video signal, with a bandwidth of 2.7 MHz, by coaxial cable from New York to Philadelphia and back.
June – W2XBS in New York (NBC) covers the Republican National Convention from Philadelphia, Pennsylvania for 33 hours, during a five-day period. The signal is transmitted via coaxial cable.
August 1 – W2XBS goes out of commission from 1 August 1940 until the 28th of October 1940 while the transmitter is adjusted from 441-line picture to 507-line picture. 
August 29 – Peter Carl Goldmark of CBS announces his invention of a color television system.
September 3 – CBS resumes its television transmissions with the first demonstration of high definition color TV, by W2XAB, transmitting from the Chrysler Building.

Debuts 

 February 21 - NBC News with Lowell Thomas, a simulcast of Lowell Thomas’ daily radio newscast, debuts on W2XBS (NBC) (1940).
 March 27- The Esso Television Reporter debuts on W2XBS (NBC) (1940). 
July 8 - Boxing from Jamaica Arena debuts on W2XBS (NBC) (1940-42).

Television shows

Programs ending during 1940

Births
January 5 – Michael O'Donoghue, writer (died 1994)
January 19 – Mike Reid, English actor and comedian (died 2007)
January 22 – John Hurt, English actor (died 2017)
January 27 – James Cromwell, actor
January 29 – Katharine Ross, actress
January 31 – Stuart Margolin, actor, The Rockford Files
February 2 – David Jason, English actor, Only Fools and Horses
February 3 – Jim Hartz, television personality
February 6
Tom Brokaw, American journalist
Jimmy Tarbuck, English comedian
February 8 – Ted Koppel, journalist
February 10 – Kathryn Mullen, puppeteer
February 12 – Ralph Bates, English actor (died 1991)
February 17 – John Lewis, politician (died 2020)
February 20 – Smokey Robinson, singer 
February 22 
Don Cannon, American news anchor
Judy Cornwell, English actress
February 23 – Peter Fonda, actor (died 2019)
February 27 – Howard Hesseman, actor, WKRP in Cincinnati, Head of the Class
February 29 
Sonja Barend, talk show host
Margit Carstensen, actress
Yoshio Harada, actor (died 2011)
Harvey Jason, actor
Monte Kiffin, coach
March 7 – Daniel J. Travanti, actor, Hill Street Blues
March 10 – Chuck Norris, actor, Walker, Texas Ranger
March 15 – Phil Lesh, musician
March 26 – James Caan, actor, Las Vegas
March 28 – Tony Barber, host
April 2 – Penelope Keith, English actress, To The Manor Born
April 12 
John Hagee, pastor
Herbie Hancock, jazz pianist
April 15 – Thea White, American voice actress (died 2021)
April 17 – Chuck Menville, American television animator and writer (died 1992)
April 25 – Al Pacino, actor
April 30 – Burt Young, actor
May 5 – Lance Henriksen, actor
May 6 – Rick Husky, producer
May 8
Emilio Delgado, actor (died 2022)
Ricky Nelson, actor (died 1985)
May 9 – James L. Brooks, producer
May 10 – Taurean Blacque, actor, Hill Street Blues
May 15 
Roger Ailes, American television executive (died 2017)
Lainie Kazan, American actress
May 17 – Peter Gerety, actor
May 22 
Michael Sarrazin, actor (died 2011)
Bernard Shaw, journalist
May 24 – Arvin Brown, American theatre and television director
June 1 – René Auberjonois, actor, Star Trek: Deep Space Nine (died 2019)
June 2 – Maree Cheatham, actress (Search for Tomorrow, General Hospital, Days of Our Lives)
June 11 – Daniel J. Sullivan, film director
June 14 – Jack Bannon, actor, Lou Grant
June 20 – John Mahoney, English-born actor, Frasier (died 2018)
June 21 – Mariette Hartley, actress
June 22 – Esther Rantzen, English consumer affairs presenter, That's Life!
June 26 – Mel White, author
July 3 – Michael Cole, actor, The Mod Squad
July 6 – Jeannie Seely, singer
July 7 – Ringo Starr, English rock drummer, The Beatles
July 13 – Patrick Stewart, English actor, Star Trek: The Next Generation
July 17
Tim Brooke-Taylor, English comedy performer, The Goodies (died 2020)
Verne Lundquist, American sportscaster
July 18 – James Brolin, actor, Marcus Welby, M.D.
July 22 – Alex Trebek, game show host, Jeopardy! (died 2020)
July 24 – Dan Hedaya, American actor
July 23 – Don Imus, American radio/television host, Imus in the Morning (died 2019)
July 31 – Roy Walker, television host
August 3 – Martin Sheen, actor, The West Wing
August 19 – Jill St. John, actress
August 22 – Judy Nugent, actress
August 23 – Richard Sanders, actor, WKRP in Cincinnati
August 26 – Don LaFontaine, voice actor 
August 28
Ken Jenkins, actor, Scrubs
Bonnie Turner, producer
September 1 – Gary Bender, sportscaster
September 5 – Raquel Welch, actress (died 2023)
September 11 – Brian De Palma, screenwriter
September 12 – Linda Gray, actress, Dallas
September 21 – Bill Kurtis, news anchor
October 4 – Christopher Stone, actor (The Interns) (died 1995)
October 9 – John Lennon, English winger-songwriter, The Beatles (killed 1980)
October 16 – Barry Corbin, American actor
October 19 – Michael Gambon, Irish-born British actor, The Singing Detective
October 28 – Susan Harris, writer
November 9 – Reynaldo Villalobos, director
November 13 – Daniel Pilon, Cuban-born actor, Dallas
November 15 – Sam Waterston, actor, Law & Order
November 20 – Tony Butala, singer
November 21 – Freddy Beras-Goico, TV host
November 22 – Terry Gilliam, actor
November 27 – Bruce Lee, actor (died 1973)
December 2 – Connie Booth, actress, Fawlty Towers
December 7 – Carole Simpson, broadcast journalist
December 11 – Donna Mills, actress, Knots Landing
December 12 – Dionne Warwick, singer
December 21 
Arvi Lind, Finnish newsreader
Don Phillips, American casting director
December 30 – James Burrows, director

References

 
TV